"Neopolitan Dreams" is a song performed and written by Australian singer–songwriter Lisa Mitchell from her second extended play Welcome to the Afternoon (2008) and first studio album, Wonder (2009). It was released in August 2008 by Scorpio Music and peaked at number 70 on the Australian ARIA chart in August 2009, a year after it was first released.

The song sold 22,000 copies on iTunes alone after it was used in European commercials for Surf detergent, 3 mobile tv (UK) and Deutsche Telekom as well as in the US for Cream Cheese.

Music video 
The official music video was released on 5 September 2008.

Track listing
Australian iTunes single
 "Neopolitan Dreams" – 3:30
 "Fall in Line" – 2:45

Charts

Release history

References

2008 songs
2008 singles
Lisa Mitchell songs
Song recordings produced by Dann Hume